Hawes Homestead is a historic home located at Duanesburg in Schenectady County, New York. It was built in the 1830s and is a -story, rectangular frame building with clapboard siding in a vernacular Greek Revival style. It has a gable roof with prominent cornice returns and a broad frieze pierced by rectangular eyebrow windows.  Also on the property are two contributing barns, a smokehouse, and a shed.

The property was covered in a 1984 study of Duanesburg historical resources.
It was listed on the National Register of Historic Places in 1984.

References

Houses on the National Register of Historic Places in New York (state)
Houses in Schenectady County, New York
Greek Revival houses in New York (state)
Houses completed in 1835
National Register of Historic Places in Schenectady County, New York